St. Mary's Chapel is a historic Episcopal chapel located near Hillsborough, Orange County, North Carolina. The congregation was established in 1759 by Anglicans, and united with the Episcopal Church of North Carolina in 1819.  The Gothic Revival style brick church building was constructed in 1858-59 and the adjacent cemetery contains graves dating to the 1700s.

The property was listed on the National Register of Historic Places in 1978.

References

Episcopal church buildings in North Carolina
Chapels in the United States
Churches on the National Register of Historic Places in North Carolina
Gothic Revival church buildings in North Carolina
Churches completed in 1859
19th-century Episcopal church buildings
Churches in Orange County, North Carolina
Hillsborough, North Carolina
National Register of Historic Places in Orange County, North Carolina